Vimal (born 30 August 1981) is an Indian actor who appears in Tamil films. Following credited appearances and a supporting role in the critically acclaimed movie Kanchivaram, he played the lead role in Pandiraj's critically acclaimed Pasanga (2009). Subsequently, he played lead roles in several low-budget productions. He established himself as a successful upcoming actor with Kalavani (2010), after that he has claimed his name with these movies Vaagai Sooda Vaa (2011), Kalakalappu (2012), Kedi Billa Killadi Ranga (2013), Manjapai (2014) and  Mannar Vagaiyara (2018).

Early life

Vimal was born in Pannankombu, a village near Manapparai, Tiruchirappalli district, Tamil Nadu, and later moved to Chennai. He discontinued his studies and began learning dancing and joined the Koothu-P-Pattarai, a theatre group in Chennai.

Vimal got married in a manner portrayed by him in Kalavani''' In 'Kalavani', its protagonist Vimal would marry the girl of his choice despite opposition from her parents. And in real life too, the actor did the same thing by entering wedlock with his girlfriend, who happens to be his relative's daughter. Vemal and Akshaya aka Priyadarsini, a medical college student in Chennai, were in love with each other. However, her parents allegedly opposed the affair, saying they were not interested in their daughter marrying an actor. Following this, Akshaya left for Kumbakonam, where Vimal was shooting for a film Eththan. From there, they went to a Murugan temple and tied the knot. Says Vimal, "We have no other option since Akshaya's parents were looking for a doctor groom for her".

Acting career

2001-2008
In 2001, he started a career as an aspiring model actor. While being a part of Koothu-P-Pattarai, Vimal was appearing in uncredited roles in several high-profile Tamil films, including Ghilli (2004),   Kuruvi (2008) and Pandhayam (2008), starring noted lead actors Vijay and Nithin Sathya. He made cameo role in the critically acclaimed movie Kanchivaram (2008).

2009-2016

He played his first leading role in Pasanga (2009), directed by Pandiraj, in which he played Meenakshisundaram, an insurance agent. The film won critical acclaim, while his performance was well received. He next appeared in A. Sarkunam's comedy entertainer Kalavani (2010) with Oviya in the female lead which went on to become a sleeper hit. In 2011, he acted in three films, Cloud Nine Movie's Thoonga Nagaram, Eththan and Vaagai Sooda Vaa, which saw him collaborating with A. Sarkunam again. Vaagai Sooda Vaa was a period piece set in the 1960s, with Vimal playing a village teacher named Veluthambi.  His other 2012 film, was Mattuthavani which was long-delayed and was a flop at the box office.  He was then seen in UTV's comedy film Kalakalappu under Sundar C's direction that features an ensemble cast.   His next release was Ishtam, a remake of Telugu hit Yemaindhi Ee Vela, in which he played an urban character for the first time.

In 2013, he acted five movies as Sillunu Oru Sandhippu, a simple love story, Kedi Billa Killadi Ranga co-starring with Sivakarthikeyan directed by Pandiraj. The film was a good opening and was a hit at the box office. Moondru Per Moondru Kadal with actors Arjun Sarja and Cheran directed by Vasanth. Ezhil's direction Desingu Raja was released on 23 August.Jannal Oram co-starring with R. Parthiepan and Vidharth. The film received mixed reviews from critics and audience. Vimal is currently working on more than half-a-dozen projects. He has play in Pulivaal (2014), a comedy thriller with actor Prasanna, remake of Malayalam film.    He has completed Manjapai (2014) and Padmamagan's Netru Indru (2014).

In 2015, he released an action film, Kaaval, followed by two comedy drama movies, Anjala (2016) and Mapla Singam (2016).

2018-present

In 2018, Boopathy Pandian's Mannar Vagaiyara. The film is produced by Vimal for the first time. It was running successful and was declared a super hit. In December, an adult comedy film, Evanukku Engeyo Matcham Irukku. It was a poor review from critics and audiences. His next two films were romantic comedies including Kalavani 2 (2019), a sequel  to Kalavani and Kanni Raasi (2020). Vimal was seen in the Zee5 crime thriller web series Vilangu (2022). The series, written and directed by Prashanth Pandiyaraj, started streaming in February and received extremely positive reviews.

Filmography

Feature films
Actor

Producer
As a producer with the studio, A3V Cinemaz:Mannar Vagaiyara'' (2018)

Web series

References

External links
 

Indian male film actors
Tamil male actors
Living people
People from Tiruchirappalli district
Male actors in Tamil cinema
1979 births